The 1923–24 Scottish Cup was the 46th staging of Scotland's most prestigious football knockout competition. The Cup was won by Airdrieonians, who defeated Hibernian 2–0 in the final.

Fourth round

Semi-finals

Replay

Second Replay

Final

The 1924 Scottish Cup Final was a one sided game with Airdrie rarely in trouble. Bob Bennie at left half dictated much of the play. Airdrie's Bob McPhail said, "Hughie Gallacher caused havoc with the Hibs defenders. He and Russell were easily our best forwards." Russell scored both goals.

Match summary

References

See also
1923–24 in Scottish football

Scottish Cup seasons
Cup
1923–24 domestic association football cups